The Victoria Days, earlier: Victoria Day, is an annual celebration in Sweden in mid July to celebrate Crown Princess Victoria's birthday.

It is celebrated around the time of the princess's birthday, 14 July, which is also a flag flying day; for milestone birthdays the celebrations may be held over multiple days.
This birthday tradition started in 1979, with Crown Princess Victoria's 2nd birthday.

The Victoria Days celebrations usually take place on the island of Öland, where the Swedish Royal family spends their summer holiday.
The day often begins at Solliden Palace, where the Crown Princess Family, King & Queen greet waiting crowds. The crowds sing "Happy Birthday to You" to Victoria, followed by cheers led by  King Carl XVI Gustaf of Sweden. The Royal Family then do a walkabout. Each year a concert is held, with performances from famous artists. The concert is attended by the Royal Family and broadcast on TV.

Victoria Award
Each year during Victoria Days, the Victoria Award (Victoriastipendiet) is awarded to a Swedish sportsperson who has performed an especially meritorious achievement during the year.

References

External links
 Official website

House of Bernadotte
July observances
Swedish flag flying days
Recurring events established in 1979
Öland
1979 establishments in Sweden
Birthdays
Summer events in Sweden